The Fox and the Crow (or The Crow and the Fox) may refer to:
 The Fox and the Crow (Aesop), one of Aesop's Fables
 The Fox and the Crow (animated characters), a pair of anthropomorphic cartoon characters and series created in 1941
 The Fox and the Crow (comics), multiple comic book series involving the characters
 The Crow and the Fox (Krylov's fable), a fable by Ivan Krylov, based on Aesop's version